The Vagabonds Act 1572 was a law passed in England under Queen Elizabeth I. It is a part of the Tudor Poor Laws and a predecessor to the Elizabethan Poor Laws.

The 1572 act provided that justices of the peace were to register the names of the "aged, decayed, and impotent" poor to determine how much money was required to care for them.  The justices of the peace would then assess all inhabitants of the parish for their keep.  Overseers of the poor would periodically conduct "views and searches" of the poor.  Those refusing to contribute to poor relief would be confined to the gaol.

Justices of the Peace were allowed to license beggars if there were too many for the parish to provide for.  Any unlicensed vagabonds were to be whipped and burned through the ear.  It further provided that any surplus funds could be used to “place and settle to work the rogues and vagabonds.”

Combined with the Poor Act 1575, the 1572 act formed the basis for the subsequent Elizabethan Poor Laws.

See also
 Vagabonds Act

Further reading
Image of Original Act on the Parliamentary website

References

English Poor Laws
Acts of the Parliament of England (1485–1603)
1572 in law
1572 in England